Çakmak Dam may refer to:

 Çakmak Dam (Samsun), a dam in Turkey
 Çakmak Dam (Edirne), a dam in Turkey